John O'Grady (17 February 1891 – 26 November 1934) was an Irish athlete. He competed in the men's shot put at the 1924 Summer Olympics. 

He was the eldest son of William and Catherine O'Grady. His mother died when he was a young child. He is buried in Kilmurry, Caherconlish, County Limerick. He was the Irish champion in the Putting 16lb Shot in 1914, 1916, 1924 and 1925. He was the Irish champion in the Putting 28lb shot from 1913-1918. The Irish Champion for Pushing the 56lb in 1917 and Slinging the 56lb in 1917, 1918 and 1924. There is a large stone monument at the end of Mulgrave street in his honor in his hometown of Limerick.

References

External links
 

1891 births
1934 deaths
Athletes (track and field) at the 1924 Summer Olympics
Irish male shot putters
Olympic athletes of Ireland
Sportspeople from Limerick (city)